Tephrosia chrysophylla, commonly known as scurf hoarypea is a species of flowering plant. It is in the 	genus Tephrosia and family Fabaceae. It is a perennial dicot. It has red flowers and compound alternating leaves.

References

chrysophylla